The OFC Champions League, also known as the O-League, is the premier men's club soccer competition in Oceania. It is organised by the OFC, Oceania's football governing body. Beginning as the Oceania Club Championship (1987–2006), it has been organised since 2007 under its current format.

The first four Club Championship titles were won by Australian clubs. Since 2006, 12 OFC titles have been won by clubs from New Zealand, one by a Papua New Guinean club and one by a New Caledonian club.

Trophies for OFC tournament winners are made by London-based silversmiths Thomas Lyte.

History and format

Oceania Club Championship
The Oceania Club Championship was played in one or two venues, in one host country. There were two or three groups with single round-robin format, semifinals and final. The tournament usually lasted about 10 days, with matches being played every 2 days.

At first, this competition was played as a single playoff match between champions of New Zealand and Australia. That competition was held in 1987 and Adelaide City won the inaugural season. Then 12 years pause came, until the OFC organised the next, all-Oceania Cup. In January 1999, the Oceania Club Championship was held in the Fijian cities of Nadi and Lautoka. Nine teams took part, with Australian side South Melbourne winning the trophy. They also qualified for the following year's FIFA Club World Cup. 

The next competition was held two years later, with an Australian team again winning the title. Wollongong Wolves won it, beating Vanuatu representative Tafea in the final. Two more editions were held under this name and format, with Sydney and Auckland City winning titles. OFC decided to change the competition format and name, so that since 2007 the competition is known as the OFC Champions League.

OFC Champions League

2007–2014
The OFC decided to change competition format, to make its main competition more interesting and more important to competing clubs.

The first two seasons saw competition with two groups of three teams each, and from the third edition onwards it consists of two groups of four teams each. Group winners progress to the final, played in double playoff format, with the winner taking the title. Unlike its previous format, O-League lasts more than a half year, starting in October and ending the following April. The O-League winner qualifies to FIFA Club World Cup, entering the competition in the playoff round.

For the 2012–13 season O-League changed its format with the introduction of qualifying stage, with the champions of the four weakest leagues competing for a play-off spot with the representative of country with the worst record from the previous tournament.  Later rather were also scheduling and format changes for the main tournament. That competition was played between March and May 2013 with introduction of semifinal stage and final played on neutral venue. First O-League one-legged final was played in Auckland, and was the first O-League final between two teams from the same country, with Auckland City defeating Waitakere United to win its 5th title.

The OFC Champions League saw another change for 2013–14 season, with the group stage played in a pre-determined location and the semifinals and final played on a home-and-away basis. Fiji was selected as host. The Preliminary stage was played six months before the group stage, and the winner entered the group stage.

In 2014, both finalists of the OFC Champions League participated in the OFC President's Cup, an invitational tournament organised by the OFC. However, President's Cup was held only once.

2014–present
In the 2014–15 season, the tournament was sponsored by Fiji Airways and renamed the Fiji Airways OFC Champions League in that season. 

Another format change came in 2017 when group stage was expanded to 16 teams with whole competition being played in the one year (preliminary stage followed by group stage and later knock-out stage). Each of four groups was hosted by one of teams from the group meaning more countries and teams included. Group winners qualified for the semifinal stage. The semifinals and final were both played on home-away basis. Following success of 2017 season, OFC added quarterfinal round for 2018 edition, meaning the top two teams from each group qualified for the knock-out stage.

The 2019 final, Hienghène Sport–AS Magenta (both from New Caledonia), marked the first time in the history of the competition that there was no side from New Zealand present.

Records and statistics

Finals

OFC Club Championship era

OFC Champions League era

Performances by club 
Past winners are:

Performances by country 

Notes:

  is no longer an OFC member.

All-time table (Top 10 Clubs) 
 As of 9th November 2022. All matches including qualifying were taken into account with a game decided by penalties counted as draw. No awarded/withdrawn games were counted.
* Number in parentheses show number of participations.

All-time table (Countries) 
 As of 9th November 2022. All matches including qualifying were taken into account with a game decided by penalties counted as draw. No awarded/withdrawn games were counted.

Notes:

  is no longer an OFC member.

See also
 Oceania Cup Winners' Cup

References

External links
OFC Official Website

 
Champions League, OFC
Oceanian championships
Multi-national professional sports leagues